The Washington secretary of state election, 1996, took place on November 5, 1996. Incumbent secretary of state Ralph Munro was re-elected.

Primary election

The primary election took place in September, with Republican incumbent Ralph Munro running unopposed. Natural Law candidate Gary Gill and Democratic candidate Phyllis Gutiérrez Kenney were also uncontested for their parties nominations.

General election

In the general election, Munro coasted to victory over Kenney and Gill.

Kenney, at the time of the election, was serving as a member of the board of trustees of the Seattle community college district. Owing to the relative efficiency of her campaign against the long-serving and affable incumbent Munro (described by the Associated Press at the time as "possibly the GOP's most popular officeholder" in Washington), governor Mike Lowry appointed Kenney to a vacant seat in the Washington House of Representatives following her defeat.

References

secretary of state
1996
1996 United States state secretary of state elections